Renco Group is an American New York City-based holding company controlled by Ira Rennert that invests in other companies across a range of industries.

History 

In August 2004, it was announced that Ronald Perelman's MacAndrews & Forbes Holdings company would form a joint venture with AM General's current owner, Renco Group, to give Perelman 70% ownership of AM General. The deal reportedly cost close to US$1 billion. In 2007, Renco Group lost ownership of its bankrupt subsidiary WCI Steel to its lenders. Through subsidiary Inteva Products, LLC, Renco Group purchased Delphi's Global Interiors and Closures businesses in March 2008. In June of 2021 Renco Group purchased Renfro Brands, Renfro Brands is a leading designer, manufacturer, and marketer of quality socks and legwear products.

Pollution
The Renco Group also owns various mills and mines in the United States and South America, and pollution problems at some of the company's properties have sparked public outcries, environmental lawsuits, and hundreds of millions of dollars in environmental penalties and fines.

One Renco subsidiary, magnesium producer US Magnesium (USM), is accused of polluting the Great Salt Lake in Utah.

Smelting operations by another Renco subsidiary, Doe Run Company, are responsible for elevated levels of lead, arsenic, and cadmium in Herculaneum, Missouri, and elevated levels of lead, copper, zinc, and sulfur dioxide in La Oroya, Peru. In 2007, La Oroya was listed by Blacksmith Institute as one of the "World's Worst Polluted Places".

References

Financial services companies established in 1986
Investment companies of the United States
Companies based in New York City
Holding companies based in New York City